Alfons Jeżewski (14 February 1914 – 10 April 1983) was a Polish sprint canoeist who competed in the late 1940s.

At the 1948 Summer Olympics in London, Jeżewski finished tenth in the K-2 10000 m event while being eliminated in the heats of the K-2 1000 m event.

References 
Sports-reference.com profile

1914 births
1983 deaths
Polish male canoeists
Sportspeople from Poznań
Olympic canoeists of Poland
Canoeists at the 1948 Summer Olympics